Statistics of Swiss Super League in the 1905–06 season.

East

Group 1

Group 2

East final

|}

Central

West

Final

Table

Results 

|colspan="3" style="background-color:#D0D0D0" align=center|22 April 1906

|-
|colspan="3" style="background-color:#D0D0D0" align=center|7 May 1906

|-
|colspan="3" style="background-color:#D0D0D0" align=center|14 May 1906

|}

FC Winterthur won the championship.

Sources 
 Switzerland 1905-06 at RSSSF

Seasons in Swiss football
Swiss Football League seasons
1905–06 in Swiss football
Swiss